The Canonbie Coalfield is a small and largely concealed coalfield at Canonbie in the south of Scotland. A comprehensive survey by Peach and Horne was published in 1903. Canonbie colliery was worked until 1920, and another mine at Archerbeck continued until 1942.

Recent work has indicated potentially economically workable reserves beneath a cover of New Red Sandstone rocks.

The following coal seams occur within the Pennine Middle Coal Measures Formation in this coalfield:
 Knottyholm
 Archerbeck
 Six Foot
 Nine Foot
 Five Foot
 Eight Foot
 Seven Foot

Further less important seams lie within the underlying Pennine Lower Coal Measures Formation and within the overlying strata of the Pennine Upper Coal Measures Formation and the Warwickshire Group including the 'High Coal' at the base of the latter.

New Proposal 

In 2014, New Age Exploration Limited proposed a new coal mine in the Canonbie area. They estimated that the new mine could operate for 26 years and yield 1.4 million tonnes of coal per annum. The emphasis was upon Coking coal as opposed to power station coal which would be a prime market in the UK and EU.

References

Coal mining regions in Scotland
Geography of Dumfries and Galloway